Hastings Street may refer to:
Hastings Street (Vancouver), an east–west traffic corridor in Vancouver and Burnaby, British Columbia, Canada
 Hastings Street (Detroit), the former center of Detroit's African-American community, removed for the Chrysler Freeway
the main street of Noosa Heads on the Sunshine Coast, Queensland
Hastings Street (album), an album by Brazzaville